K2-24 (also known as EPIC 203771098) is a metal-rich G3-type main sequence star larger and more massive than the Sun, located  away in the constellation Scorpius. Two confirmed transiting exoplanets are known to orbit this star. An attempt to detect stellar companions using adaptive optics imaging at the Keck telescope was negative however later observations using lucky imaging at the Danish 1.54 m telescope at La Silla Observatory detected a possible companion at 3.8 arcseconds distance from K2-24.

Planetary system

Discovery
Erik A. Petigura and team analyzed data obtained from the Kepler space telescope during its observation of the K2 Campaign 2 field. They reported the discovery and confirmation of both planets b and c. The Planetary signals were independently detected by Andrew Vanderburg and collaborators.

Characteristics
The two known planets in this system have radii equal to  5.4 and  7.5 times that of the Earth. This places both planets radii between that of Uranus and Saturn, a range not present within the Solar System. With orbital periods of 20.9 days and 42.4 days, the planets are within 1% of the 2:1 mean-motion resonance. The low observed eccentricities and near orbital resonance provide evidence regarding the formation and evolution of the system, suggesting that they could possibly have resulted from gravitational interactions with a protoplanetary disk. K2-24c at 15.4 earth masses is significantly lighter than K2-24b's 19 Earth masses despite being a larger planet. It is estimated that K2-24b's atmosphere makes up 26% of its mass while K2-24c's atmosphere makes up 52%. The current model of core-nucleated accretion predicts that runaway accretion should occur when a planet reaches approximately 50% atmosphere by mass, this makes K2-24c a potential challenge to the model.

References

External links
 The Extrasolar Planets Encyclopaedia  entry for K2-24b
 The Extrasolar Planets Encyclopaedia  entry for K2-24c

G-type main-sequence stars
Scorpius (constellation)
Planetary systems with two confirmed planets
Planetary transit variables